Lake Kivijärvi is a medium-sized lake in South Karelia, Eastern Finland, with a total area of . The name Kivijärvi is rather common name of the lake. In Finland there are 121 lakes with the same name. This one is the second biggest.

See also
List of lakes in Finland

References

Lakes of Finland